Chiloschista segawae is a species of leafless epiphytic or orchid that forms clumps with many radiating, flattened green roots. Up to fifteen, whitish green or yellow flowers are arranged along a pendulous flowering stem. It grows on trees in forest on Taiwan.

Description 
The side lobes are erect and the middle lobe is small with a sac-like base. Flowering occurs from April to May.

Taxonomy and naming
This orchid was first formally described in 1934 by Genkei Masamune who gave it the name Sarcochilus segawae and published the description in Transactions, Natural History Society of Formosa. In 1938, Masamune and Noriaki Fukuyama changed the name to Chiloschista segawae.

Distribution and habitat

References

segawae
Orchids of Taiwan
Plants described in 1934